Omid Nezamipour  is an Iranian football midfielder who currently plays for Iranian football club Pars Jonoubi in the Persian Gulf Pro League.

References

Living people
Association football midfielders
Iranian footballers
Gostaresh Foulad F.C. players
1986 births
Saba players
Persian Gulf Pro League players
Malavan players